Pierre Rössinger is a Swiss retired slalom canoeist who competed in the mid-1950s. He won a silver medal in the C-2 team event at the 1953 ICF Canoe Slalom World Championships in Meran.

References

Swiss male canoeists
Possibly living people
Year of birth missing
Medalists at the ICF Canoe Slalom World Championships